WXC, or wxc, may refer to:
The Warrior Xtreme Cagefighting
The IAAF World Cross Country Championships
WXC, the National Rail code for Wrexham Central railway station in Wales, UK

See also